Egginton is an English surname. Notable people with the surname include:

Frank Egginton (1908–1990), British contemporary painter
Tony Egginton (born 1951), Mayor of Mansfield, England
William Egginton (born 1969), American literary critic and philosopher

See also
Eggington (surname)

English-language surnames